Limnophis branchi is a species of natricine snake found in Angola.

References

Limnophis
Reptiles of Angola
Reptiles described in 2020